USS Boston may refer to:

, was a gundalow launched in 1776 and burned to avoid capture by the British on 13 October 1776
, was a 24-gun frigate, commissioned in 1777 and captured by the British in 1780
, was a 28-gun frigate lost during the War of 1812
, was an 18-gun sloop of war commissioned in 1826 and wrecked in the Bahamas in 1846
, was a protected cruiser commissioned in 1887 and took part in the Spanish–American War
, was a heavy cruiser commissioned 1943 and active in both World War II and the Korean War
, was a Los Angeles-class nuclear attack submarine decommissioned in 1999

United States Navy ship names